Ladies Must Live may refer to:

Ladies Must Live (1921 film), American silent societal drama
Ladies Must Live (1940 film), American romantic comedy

See also
Ladies Must Love, 1933 American comedy-drama